This is a list of the NCAA outdoor champions in the shot put.  Measurement was conducted in imperial distances (feet and inches) until 1975.  Metrication occurred in 1976, so all subsequent championships were measured in metric distances.

Champions
Key
A=Altitude assisted

References

GBR Athletics

External links
NCAA Division I men's outdoor track and field

Shot NCAA Men's Division I Outdoor Track and Field Championships
Outdoor track, men
Shot put

https://umaine.edu/150/through-the-decades/1915-1924/